This is a list of 285 species in Cerodontha, a genus of leaf miner flies in the family Agromyzidae.

Cerodontha species

 Cerodontha aberdarensis Spencer, 1985 c g
 Cerodontha abyssinica Spencer, 1961 c g
 Cerodontha adunca Boucher, 2002 c g
 Cerodontha affinis (Fallen, 1823) c g
 Cerodontha africana Spencer, 1985 c g
 Cerodontha agraensis Tandon, 1966 c g
 Cerodontha albineura Zlobin, 1993 c g
 Cerodontha alishana Sasakawa, 2008 g
 Cerodontha alpestris Martinez, 1987 c g
 Cerodontha alpina Nowakowski, 1967 c g
 Cerodontha altaica Zlobin, 1993 c g
 Cerodontha andensis Spencer, 1963 c g
 Cerodontha angela Boucher g
 Cerodontha angulata (Loew, 1869) i c g b
 Cerodontha angustipennis Harrison, 1959 c g
 Cerodontha aristella Spencer, 1961 c g
 Cerodontha aristosa Spencer, 1986 i c g
 Cerodontha atra (Meigen, 1830) c g
 Cerodontha atrata Zlobin, 1986 c g
 Cerodontha atrissima Spencer, 1977 c g
 Cerodontha atronitens Hendel, 1920 c g
 Cerodontha attenuata Spencer, 1986 i c g
 Cerodontha augustensis Spencer, 1977 c g
 Cerodontha australis Malloch, 1925 c g
 Cerodontha bambusae Martinez, 1992 c g
 Cerodontha beigerae Nowakowski, 1972 c g
 Cerodontha bicolorata Spencer, 1969 i c g
 Cerodontha bimaculata (Meigen, 1830) c g
 Cerodontha biseta Hendel, 1920 c g
 Cerodontha bisetiorbita (Sasakawa, 1955) c g
 Cerodontha bisetosa Zlobin, 1993 c g
 Cerodontha bispinulosa Sasakawa, 1996 c g
 Cerodontha bistrigata Frey, 1945 c g
 Cerodontha bohemani (Ryden, 1951) c g
 Cerodontha braziliana Spencer, 1963 c g
 Cerodontha brisiaca Nowakowski, 1972 c g
 Cerodontha bulbiseta Hendel, 1931 c g
 Cerodontha burmensis Zlobin, 2001 c g
 Cerodontha butomomyzina Spencer, 1969 i c g
 Cerodontha calamagrostidis Nowakowski, 1967 i c g
 Cerodontha calosoma (Hendel, 1931) i c g
 Cerodontha capitata (Zetterstedt, 1848) i c g
 Cerodontha caricicola Hering, 1926 c g
 Cerodontha cariciphaga Spencer, 1963 c g
 Cerodontha caricivora (Groschke, 1954) c g
 Cerodontha carpathica Nowakowski, 1972 c g
 Cerodontha caucasica Zlobin, 1979 c g
 Cerodontha caudata Zlobin, 1986 c g
 Cerodontha chaixiana Groschke, 1955 c g
 Cerodontha chilenica Spencer, 1982 c g
 Cerodontha chilensis Spencer, 1982 c g
 Cerodontha chillcottiella Spencer, 1986 i c g
 Cerodontha chonoterminalis Sasakawa, 2005 c g
 Cerodontha churchillensis Spencer, 1969 i c g
 Cerodontha cingulata (Zetterstedt, 1848) c g
 Cerodontha colombiensis Spencer, 1984 c g
 Cerodontha cornigera Meijere, 1934 c g
 Cerodontha courtalamensis Beri & Ipe, 1971 c g
 Cerodontha coxalis Martinez, 1987 c g
 Cerodontha crassiseta (Strobl, 1900) c g
 Cerodontha cruciata Blanchard, 1938 c g
 Cerodontha curta (Sasakawa, 1963) c g
 Cerodontha darjeelingensis Singh & Ipe, 1973 c g
 Cerodontha delectabilis Spencer, 1977 c g
 Cerodontha denticornis (Panzer, 1806) c g
 Cerodontha deserta Zlobin, 1993 c g
 Cerodontha dorsalis (Loew, 1863) i c g b  (grass sheathminer)
 Cerodontha downhillensis Singh & Ipe, 1973 c g
 Cerodontha duplicata Spencer, 1961 c g
 Cerodontha ecaudata Sasakawa, 2005 c g
 Cerodontha elbergi Nowakowski, 1972 c g
 Cerodontha elevata Spencer, 1985 c g
 Cerodontha eminula Sasakawa, 2005 c g
 Cerodontha eriophori Nowakowski, 1973 g
 Cerodontha eriphori Nowakowski, 1972 c g
 Cerodontha estlandica Zlobin, 1993 c g
 Cerodontha eucaricis Nowakowski, 1967 g
 Cerodontha eucaris Nowakowski, 1967 i c g
 Cerodontha fasciata (Strobl, 1880) i c g
 Cerodontha flavicornis (Egger, 1862) c g
 Cerodontha flavifrons Philippi, 1865 c g
 Cerodontha flavipalpis Sasakawa, 1988 c g
 Cerodontha flavocingulata (Strobl, 1909) i c g
 Cerodontha flavohalterata Ipe, 1971 c g
 Cerodontha frankensis Spencer, 1969 i c g
 Cerodontha frosti Spencer, 1973 i c g
 Cerodontha fujianensis Sasakawa, 1996 c g
 Cerodontha fujianica Chen & Wang, 2003 c g
 Cerodontha fulva Spencer, 1977 c g
 Cerodontha fulvipes (Meigen, 1830) c g
 Cerodontha fulvithorax Malloch, 1934 c g
 Cerodontha fumipennis Zlobin, 1993 c g
 Cerodontha fuscifrons Spencer, 1969 i c g
 Cerodontha fusculata Spencer, 1986 i c g
 Cerodontha gallica Nowakowski, 1967 c g
 Cerodontha geniculata (Fallen, 1823) c g
 Cerodontha gibbardi Spencer, 1969 i c g
 Cerodontha gorodkovi Zlobin, 1979 c g
 Cerodontha gracitis Spencer, 1969 i c g
 Cerodontha griffithsi Nowakowski, 1967 c g
 Cerodontha guineana Zlobin, 1993 c g
 Cerodontha hakusana Sasakawa, 2005 c g
 Cerodontha handlirschi Nowakowski, 1967 c g
 Cerodontha hennigi Nowakowski, 1967 c g
 Cerodontha heringiella Spencer, 1961 c g
 Cerodontha hirsuta Sasakawa, 1972 c g
 Cerodontha hirtae Nowakowski, 1967 i c g
 Cerodontha hirtipennis Sasakawa, 1977 c g
 Cerodontha honshuensis Henshaw, 1989 c g
 Cerodontha hungarica Zlobin, 1980 c g
 Cerodontha illinoensis (Malloch, 1934) i c g
 Cerodontha imbuta Meigen, 1838 c g
 Cerodontha impatientis Sasakawa, 1992 c g
 Cerodontha impercepta Spencer, 1986 i c g
 Cerodontha impolita Spencer, 1986 c g
 Cerodontha incisa (Meigen, 1830) i c g b
 Cerodontha inconspicua (Malloch, 1913) i c g
 Cerodontha inepta Spencer, 1963 c g
 Cerodontha inflata Boucher, 2002 c g
 Cerodontha intermedia Garg, 1971 c g
 Cerodontha ireos Robineau-Desvoidy, 1851 c g
 Cerodontha iridicola (Koizumi, 1953) c g
 Cerodontha iridophora Spencer, 1973 i c g
 Cerodontha islandica Griffiths, 1968 c g
 Cerodontha jacutica Zlobin, 1979 c g
 Cerodontha javana Meijere, 1934 c g
 Cerodontha kakamegae Spencer, 1985 c g
 Cerodontha kalatopensis Singh & Garg, 1970 c g
 Cerodontha kambaitiensis Zlobin, 2001 c g
 Cerodontha kasparyani Zlobin, 1997 c g
 Cerodontha kennethi Zlobin, 1997 c g
 Cerodontha kenyana Zlobin, 2001 c g
 Cerodontha kerteszi Hendel, 1931 c g
 Cerodontha kerzhneri Zlobin, 1979 c g
 Cerodontha kirae Sasakawa, 1962 c g
 Cerodontha kivuensis Spencer, 1959 c g
 Cerodontha labradorensis Spencer, 1969 i c g
 Cerodontha lacerata Zlobin, 1993 c g
 Cerodontha laetifica Spencer, 1966 c g
 Cerodontha lapplandica (Ryden, 1956) c g
 Cerodontha latifrons Spencer, 1986 i c g
 Cerodontha lindrothi Griffiths, 1964 i c g
 Cerodontha lineella (Zetterstedt, 1838) c g
 Cerodontha longimentula (Sasakawa, 1963) c g
 Cerodontha longipennis (Loew, 1869) i c g
 Cerodontha lonicerae (Robineau-desvoidy, 1851 i g
 Cerodontha luctuosa (Meigen, 1830) i c g
 Cerodontha lunulata Sasakawa, 1992 c g
 Cerodontha luzulae Groschke, 1957 c g
 Cerodontha lyneborgi Spencer, 1972 c g
 Cerodontha maclayi Spencer, 1981 i c g
 Cerodontha macminni Spencer, 1986 i c g
 Cerodontha macrophalloides Sasakawa, 1992 c g
 Cerodontha magellani Spencer, 1982 c g
 Cerodontha magna Spencer, 1973 c g
 Cerodontha magnicornis (Loew, 1869) i c g
 Cerodontha magnificans Spencer, 1959 c g
 Cerodontha malaisei Spencer, 1981 i c g
 Cerodontha melicae Nowakowski, 1972 c g
 Cerodontha mellita Spencer, 1971 c g
 Cerodontha michaeli Zlobin, 2000 c g
 Cerodontha milleri Spencer, 1973 c g
 Cerodontha mixta Zlobin, 1984 c g
 Cerodontha montanoides (Spencer, 1981) i c g
 Cerodontha morosa (Meigen, 1830) i c g
 Cerodontha morula Hendel, 1920 c g
 Cerodontha muscina (Meigen, 1830) i c g
 Cerodontha mussooriensis Garg, 1971 c g
 Cerodontha myanmarensis Zlobin, 2001 c g
 Cerodontha nartshukae Zlobin, 1984 c g
 Cerodontha negrosensis (Sasakawa, 1963) c g
 Cerodontha nigra Spencer, 1984 c g
 Cerodontha nigricornis Becker, 1919 c g
 Cerodontha nigricoxa Malloch, 1914 c g
 Cerodontha nigrihalterata Boucher, 2005 c g
 Cerodontha nitidiventris Malloch, 1934 c g
 Cerodontha notopleuralis Sasakawa, 1988 c g
 Cerodontha nowakowskii Zlobin, 1984 c g
 Cerodontha obliqua Zlobin, 1993 c g
 Cerodontha obscurata Martinez, 1992 c g
 Cerodontha occidentalis Sehgal, 1968 i c g
 Cerodontha occidoparva Boucher, 2002 c g
 Cerodontha okazakii (Matsumura, 1916) c g
 Cerodontha omissa Spencer, 1961 c g
 Cerodontha orbitalis Zlobin, 1984 c g
 Cerodontha orbitona Spencer, 1960 c g
 Cerodontha orcina Spencer, 1973 c g
 Cerodontha oryziphila Zlobin, 1993 c g
 Cerodontha oryzivora Spencer, 1961 c g
 Cerodontha pallidiciliata Spencer, 1969 i c g
 Cerodontha paludosa Spencer, 1981 i c g
 Cerodontha palustris Nowakowski, 1972 c g
 Cerodontha pappi Zlobin, 1980 c g
 Cerodontha parvella Spencer, 1986 c g
 Cerodontha patagonica Spencer, 1982 c g
 Cerodontha pathanapuramensis Ipe, 1971 c g
 Cerodontha pecki Spencer, 1973 i c g
 Cerodontha phalaridis Nowakowski, 1967 c g
 Cerodontha phragmitidis Nowakowski, 1967 c g
 Cerodontha phragmitophila Hering, 1935 c g
 Cerodontha piliseta Becker, 1903 c g
 Cerodontha pilosa Boucher, 2008 c g
 Cerodontha poemyzina Spencer, 1963 c g
 Cerodontha pollinosa (Melander, 1913) i
 Cerodontha poolei Spencer, 1986 i c g
 Cerodontha pseuderrans Hendel, 1931 c g
 Cerodontha pseudodorsalis Zlobin, 1979 c g
 Cerodontha pseudopygmina Zlobin, 1986 c g
 Cerodontha pubicata Spencer, 1959 c g
 Cerodontha puertoricensis Spencer, 1973 c g
 Cerodontha pusilla Zlobin, 1997 c g
 Cerodontha pygmaea (Meigen, 1830) i c g
 Cerodontha pygmina Hendel, 1931 c g
 Cerodontha pygminoides Spencer, 1981 i c g
 Cerodontha quatei Sasakawa, 1996 c g
 Cerodontha questa Spencer, 1981 i c g
 Cerodontha rhodendorfi Nowakowski, 1967 c g
 Cerodontha robusta Malloch, 1925 c g
 Cerodontha rohdendorfi Nowakowski, 1967 g
 Cerodontha rozkosnyi Cerny, 2007 c g
 Cerodontha ruficornis Zlobin, 1986 c g
 Cerodontha sasae (Sasakawa, 1961) c g
 Cerodontha sasakawai Zlobin, 1984 c g
 Cerodontha scirpi (Karl, 1926) i c g b
 Cerodontha scirpioides Zlobin, 1997 c g
 Cerodontha scirpivora (Spencer, 1969) i g
 Cerodontha scleriae Martinez, 1992 c g
 Cerodontha scripivora Spencer, 1969 c g
 Cerodontha scutellaris (Roser, 1840) c g
 Cerodontha setariae Spencer, 1959 c g
 Cerodontha setifrons Hendel, 1931 c g
 Cerodontha sibirica Zlobin, 1979 c g
 Cerodontha silvatica Groschke, 1957 c g
 Cerodontha siwalikensis Singh & Garg, 1970 c g
 Cerodontha spencerae Zlobin, 1993 c g
 Cerodontha spinata (Groschke, 1954) c g
 Cerodontha spinipenis (Sasakawa, 1963) c g
 Cerodontha stackelbergi Nowakowski, 1972 c g
 Cerodontha staryi (Stary, 1930) c g
 Cerodontha stuckenbergiella Spencer, 1977 c g
 Cerodontha stuckenberigella Spencer, 1977 c g
 Cerodontha subangulata (Malloch, 1916) i c g
 Cerodontha sudzukhensis Zlobin, 1993 c g
 Cerodontha suntarica Zlobin, 1993 c g
 Cerodontha superciliosa (Zetterstedt, 1860) i c g
 Cerodontha suputinka Zlobin, 1993 c g
 Cerodontha suturalis (Hendel, 1931) c g
 Cerodontha sylvesterensis Spencer, 1976 c g
 Cerodontha sympatria Zlobin, 1997 c g
 Cerodontha taigensis Zlobin, 1986 c g
 Cerodontha tanasijtshuki Zlobin, 1979 c g
 Cerodontha temeculensis Spencer, 1981 i c g
 Cerodontha thompsoni (Frick, 1952) i c g
 Cerodontha thulensis Griffiths, 1966 i c g
 Cerodontha thunebergi Nowakowski, 1967 c g
 Cerodontha togashii Sasakawa, 2005 c g
 Cerodontha toluca Boucher, 2002 c g
 Cerodontha triplicata Spencer, 1963 c g
 Cerodontha trispinata Spencer, 1977 c g
 Cerodontha trispinella Spencer, 1977 c g
 Cerodontha trispinosa Spencer, 1977 c g
 Cerodontha ultima Spencer, 1969 i c g
 Cerodontha unguicornis Hendel, 1932 c g
 Cerodontha unica Zlobin, 1993 c g
 Cerodontha unisetiorbita Zlobin, 1993 c g
 Cerodontha ussuriensis Zlobin, 1979 c g
 Cerodontha vandalitiensis Spencer, 1966 c g
 Cerodontha venturii Nowakowski, 1967 c g
 Cerodontha versicolor Ipe, 1971 c g
 Cerodontha vietnamensis (Sasakawa, 1963) c g
 Cerodontha vignae Nowakowski, 1967 g
 Cerodontha vigneae Nowakowski, 1967 c g
 Cerodontha vinokurovi Zlobin, 1993 c g
 Cerodontha vittigera Malloch, 1927 c g
 Cerodontha vladimiri Cerny, 2007 c g
 Cerodontha voluptabilis Spencer, 1977 c g
 Cerodontha walarai (Singh & Ipe, 1970) c g
 Cerodontha xanthocera Hendel, 1920 c g
 Cerodontha yukonensis Spencer, 1969 i c g
 Cerodontha zaitzeviana Zlobin, 1993 c g
 Cerodontha zejana Zlobin, 1993 c g
 Cerodontha zlobini Spencer, 1987 c g
 Cerodontha zlobiniana Spencer, 1987 c g
 Cerodontha zoerneri Nowakowski, 1972 c g
 Cerodontha zuskai Nowakowski, 1972 c g

Data sources: i = ITIS, c = Catalogue of Life, g = GBIF, b = Bugguide.net

References

Cerodontha
Articles created by Qbugbot